In United States federal legislation, the Rivers and Harbors Act of 1913 appropriated money for various Congressional river and harbor improvement projects, the most prominent of which was Indiana Harbor, Indiana.

1913 in American law
62nd United States Congress
United States federal legislation
United States federal appropriations legislation